Nabin Rabha (born 11 December 1996) is an Indian professional footballer who lastly played as a defender for NorthEast United in the Indian Super League.

Career

Early career
Born in Boko, Kamrup rural district, Rabha began his career with Kamrupa Football Coaching Centre at Boko. Later he joined SAI (Sports Authority of India), Guwahati Centre. He represented Meghalaya state team for the U-14 national (at Goa) and also selected for U-17 national team. He also played at Fateh Hyderabad AFC in the 2017–18 I-League 2nd Division.

Shillong Lajong F.C.
On 3 November 2018, Rabha rejoined Shillong Lajong F.C. from Fateh Hyderabad AFC for 2018–19 I-League season. He won the Meghalaya State League and the Shillong Premier League with Shillong Lajong FC in the 2019–20 season.

NorthEast United 
On 10 June 2020, Nabin Rabha joined NorthEast United FC from Shillong Lajong.

Career statistics

References

External links

Living people
1996 births
People from Kamrup district
Indian footballers
Shillong Lajong FC players
NorthEast United FC players
Association football defenders
Footballers from Assam
Footballers from Meghalaya
Indian Super League players
I-League players
Fateh Hyderabad A.F.C. players